A.tong is one of the Garo dialect Sino-Tibetan (or Tibeto-Burman) language which is also related to Koch, Rabha, Bodo other than Garo language. It is spoken in the South Garo Hills and West Khasi Hills districts of Meghalaya state in Northeast India, southern Kamrup district in Assam, and adjacent areas in Bangladesh. The correct spelling "A.tong" is based on the way the speakers themselves pronounce the name of their language. There is no glottal stop in the name and it is not a tonal language.

A reference grammar of the language has been published by Seino van Breugel. A dictionary with Atong–English and English-A.tong sections, as well as semantic word lists was published in 2021, two years after the publication of an analysis of A.tong stories. In 2009, a book of stories in A.tong and an Atong-English dictionary were published by and sold at the Tura Book Room in Tura, Meghalaya, India. It is not certain if those books are still available there. The A.tong spelling system used in those books is explained in the A.tong Spelling Guide, available online.

Atong has been classified as an endangered language by Ethnologue. Atong's situation is most probably due to the influence of Standard Garo, a prestige language in the State of Meghalaya. Many parents are not teaching Atong to their children anymore. However in there are still places in South Garo Hills and West Khasi Hills where Atong is still spoken en also transmitted to the younger generation.

Sociolinguistics
There is no current estimate of the number of speakers available; according to the Linguistic Survey of India, it was spoken by approximately 15,000 people in the 1920s. Since the Atong are considered a subdivision of the Garos, they are not counted as a separate ethnic or linguistic community by the Indian government.

Almost all Atong speakers are bilingual in Garo to a greater or lesser extent, and Garo is seen as the more prestigious language. Because there is a Bible translation in Garo, but not in Atong, it is the language used in all churches and most Atong speakers are Christians. Garo is also the language of education in schools in the Atong-speaking area, although some schools provide education in English.

Mutual intelligibility with Garo
In India, the Atongs are considered to belong to the Garo Tribe, however, they speak a distinct language, which, however, has no official status of its own. The Atong people are members of the Garo Scheduled Tribe, whose official Scheduled tribe language is Garo. Garo has a standardised form of speech used in education, administration, the press and literature. Linguistically speaking, Atong and Standard Garo may be different languages, given that they have different sound systems, vocabulary and grammar. However, due to the fact that most Atongs are bilingual in Standard Garo to various degrees, intelligibility is one-way: Atong speakers understand Standard Garo but speakers of Standard Garo may not understand Atong.

Phonology 

The phonemes of Atong are given in International Phonetic Alphabet (IPA) in Table 1. That table also presents how the phonemes are written in the Atong alphabet used for everyday writing by people who are not linguists. As we can see in the table, the glottal stop can be written with either a bullet or an apostrophe. The bullet  was used by missionaries to write the glottal stop in Garo when the writing system for that language was created in the 1800s. The apostrophe has since been adopted to write the glottal stop as it is available on all computer keyboards. The vowel phoneme  is written  in the orthography, as it is in Khasi and Welsh. It was the Welsh Presbyterians that developed the Khasi writing system and used the letter  to write the phoneme  in Khasi.

The consonant phoneme  has aspirated and non-aspirated pronunciations [sʰ ~ s]. The aspirated allophone , occurs at the beginning of a syllable, while the unaspirated  occurs the end of a syllable. Both phonemes are written with the letter . Aspirated  also occurs in other Asian languages such as Burmese and Korean.

Glottalization 

Glottalization in Atong is a feature that operates on the level of the syllable, and that manifests itself as a glottal stop at the end of the syllable. Glottalization only affects open syllables and syllables ending in a continuant or a vowel. In the following examples, glottalized syllables are indicated by a following bullet. The pronunciation is given between square brackets where the symbol  represents the glottal stop and the full stop represents the syllable boundary.

In the examples below, the following abbreviations are used: COS 'change of state', CUST 'customary aspect', INCOM 'incompletive aspect', NEG 'negative',

If the glottalized continuant is followed by a consonant, the glottalized phoneme is not released, i.e. man’ -khu-cha  (be.able-INCOM-NEG)‘is not yet possible’.

If the glottalized continuant is followed by a vowel, it is released and the release repeats the continuant so that it can be said to act like the onset of the following syllable, e.g. man’ -ok  (be.able-COS) ‘was able’.

Vowels 

Atong has six vowel qualities occurring in the native vocabulary as well as in loanwords: . In addition, there are four long vowels which are only found in loanwords from English and Indic languages. These are usually pronounced longer than the indigenous vowels: /iː/  , /eː/  , /aː/   and /oː/  . In the orthography, long vowels are represented by double letters. Note that /uː/ and /əː/ are not attested.

Examples of minimal pairs and near minimal pairs are given in the table below. 

The difference between the loan and the indigenous words is a matter of vowel quality. In closed syllables, where Atong vowels would be pronounced lowered and more retracted, the loan vowels will have the same quality as the Atong vowels in open syllables. Not all loan words that have long vowels in the source language have long vowels in Atong, and not all loans that can be pronounced with a long vowel in Atong have a long vowel in the source language.

Syllable structure
The canonical syllable structure of Atong is (C)V(C), where C stands for any consonant and V for any vowel. This structure can be maintained if words like mai 'rice', askui 'star' and chokhoi 'fishing basket' are analysed as containing a vowel and a final glide (see glide (linguistics)). The glide, presented by the letter i, is the coda of the syllable rather than an element of the nucleus. In phonemic writing the words would look like this: /maj/, /askuj/, /t͡ɕokʰoj/.

There are two glides in the language: /w/ and /j/. The glide /w/ occurs in both syllable initial and syllable final position, e.g. wak 'pig' and saw 'rotten, fermented' respectively. The glide /j/ occurs only syllable finally, e.g. tyi /təj/ 'water'. Traditional words with the structure CVVC do not exist, e.g. *gaut or *main (where the asterisk [*] indicates the non-existence of these words).

If a diphthong is defined as two vowels that can occur in the nucleus of a syllable, then Atong has no diphthongs. There are words that are written with two adjacent vowel graphemes or letters, e.g. mai 'rice', askui 'star', and chokhoi 'fishing basket'. However, the letter i in these words represents a consonant phoneme, viz. the off glide /j/ (see Table 1). The writing system uses the letter i in this way because the letters j and y are both used to represent other phonemes.

Examples 

Atong has many loanwords from Assamese language, Bengali, Hindi and English. These loanwords can all easily be spelled in Atong orthography using the Latin script (also called the Roman script). Example of loans from English are: redio (from the English word 'radio'), rens (from the English word 'wrench'), skul (from the English word 'school'), miting (from the English word 'meeting'). Other examples of loanwords are chola (from Assamese: চোলা /sʊla/ ‘jacket, tunic, coat’) and jama (from Assamese জামা /jāmā/ ‘coat, shirt, blouse jacket’).

References

External links
 Atongmorot, educational YouTube Channel 
Atong basic lexicon at the Global Lexicostatistical Database
Atong-English Dictionary
Atongmorot Balgaba Golpho
Atong Spelling Guide

Endangered languages of India
Languages of India
Languages of Meghalaya
Sal languages
Non-tonal languages in tonal families
Endangered Sino-Tibetan languages